Christopher William Burford III (born January 31, 1938) is a former American football wide receiver.

Burford was a football captain at Stanford, leading the NCAA in receptions with 61 in 1959. The following year, he was a first round draft pick of the Dallas Texans. in the American Football League (AFL)

Burford would catch 46 passes in his rookie season for the Texans, which went for 789 yards and five touchdowns. In 1961, he improved, catching 51 passes for 850 yards with five touchdowns to garner All-Star honors. In the 1962 season, he would play in just 11 games and missed out on the AFL title run, but he caught 45 passes for 645 yards for a league-high 12 touchdowns to garner All-Pro honors.  In 1963, he caught a career high 68 passes for 824 yards for nine touchdowns. In each of those seasons, he led the team in receptions. He followed it up with 51 catches for 675 yards and seven touchdowns in 1964, although he played in only 12 games. 1965 meant just 11 games played, but he caught 47 passes for 575 yards and six touchdowns. He led the team in receptions for the fourth and last time.

In his penultimate year, Burford played every game and caught 58 passes for 758 yards for eight touchdowns as the Chiefs broke through for the postseason run. He made his only appearances in the playoffs during the AFL Championship Game and the first Super Bowl, making four receptions in each game. Burford would play in nine games to close out his career in 1967. He made 25 catches for 389 yards and three touchdowns. In his last game against the New York Jets, he closed it out with two catches for 17 yards with a touchdown catch from Len Dawson. At the age of 29, he retired. By the end of his career, he was the Chiefs all-time reception leader (391) with 5,505 yards and 55 touchdowns.

For most of his AFL career, Burford was in the top ten in receiving catches, yards, and touchdowns.  Burford is a 1975 inductee of the Chiefs' Hall of Fame.  In 2010, he was inducted into the African-American Ethnic Sports Hall of Fame.  Burford, who is white, was nominated by former black teammate Abner Haynes.

References

1938 births
Living people
American Football League All-Star players
American Football League announcers
American Football League players
American football wide receivers
College Football Hall of Fame inductees
Dallas Texans (AFL) players
Kansas City Chiefs players
Players of American football from Oakland, California
Stanford Cardinal football players